West Chester, Ohio, can refer to:

West Chester Township, Butler County, Ohio, a civil township of southwestern Ohio
Olde West Chester, Ohio, the original settlement that gave its name to the township
West Chester, Tuscarawas County, Ohio, an unincorporated community in Tuscarawas County